The Court of Peculiars is one of the ecclesiastical courts of the Church of England. The court sits with a Dean, who is also the Dean of the Arches. The Registrars are the Joint Provincial Registrars. The Court of Peculiars deals with all legal matters from peculiar parishes in the province. Until 1545, ecclesiastical judges were required to have a degree in canon law; thereafter, they only needed a doctorate in civil law. Binding precedent was only introduced into the ecclesiastical courts in the nineteenth century.

List of deans of the court
 Sir Philip Wilbraham-Baker, 1955
 Sir Henry Willink, 19551970
 Walter Wigglesworth, 19711972
 Sir Harold Kent, 19721976
 Kenneth Elphinstone, 19771980
 Sir John Owen, 19802000
 Sheila Cameron, 20002009
 Charles George, 2009

Notes

References

 

Canon law of the Church of England
Ecclesiastical courts